Amarna letter EA 252, titled: Sparing One's Enemies, is a square, mostly flat clay tablet letter written on both sides, and the bottom edge. Each text line was written with a horizontal line scribed below the text line, as well as a vertical left margin-line, (beginning of text at left) scribe line on the obverse of the tablet. The letter contains 14 (15) lines on the obverse, continuing on the bottom tablet edge to conclude at line 31 on the reverse, leaving a small space before the final tablet edge. At least 4 lines from the obverse intrude into the text of the reverse (appearing as upside-down cuneiform into the text of the reverse), actually dividing the reverse into a top half and bottom half, and even creating a natural spacing segue to the reverse's text, and the story.

Letter EA 252 is authored by Labaya, by the 'Man, city-state' (of) Šakmu (Shechem today), and written to the Pharaoh. The letter is letter one of three letters authored by him, to the Pharaoh. In the current List of Amarna letters by size, it is the smallest clay tablet letter, being only ~3 in tall by ~2 in wide.

The Amarna letters, about 300, numbered up to EA 382, are a mid 14th century BC, about 1350 BC and 20–25 years later, correspondence. The initial corpus of letters were found at Akhenaten's city Akhetaten, in the floor of the Bureau of Correspondence of Pharaoh; others were later found, adding to the body of letters.

Brief letter summary
The topic of the letter is Labaya's defense against other governors of city-states that he is engaged with. A town and statue were taken, and he defends his then follow-up actions of pursuit, to the pharaoh's commissioner. He states: "my parts are eaten/ I'm being slandered". The exact quote is "...he has slandered me, (and/ u), I am slandered-(ši-ir-ti)."

Directly next, an allegory, lines 16–19, follows concerning "a pinched ant-defending itself". Basically, if an ant is attacked, should it just sit quiet, or defend against the "hand of the man" that attacks? Labaya then explains his justification for pursuing the men in warfare (Akkadian nukurtu, nu-KÚR-te, (last syllable most variable in spellings)), and the events to follow.

The letter

EA 252: "Sparing One's Enemies"
EA 252, letter one of three. (Not a linear, line-by-line translation, and English from French.)
(Obverse only, Paragraphs I, ~II; about a 3-paragraph letter):

Obverse:
(Lines 1-4)--Say to the king, my lord: Message of Lab'ayu, your servant. I fall at the feet of the king, my lord.
(5-9)--As to your having written me, "Guard the men who seized the city;" how am I to guard (such) men? It was in war (nukurtu) the city was seized.
(10-15)--When I had sworn my peace—and when I swore the magnate swore with me—the city, along with my god, was seized. He has slandered me: gl (and) (ši-ir-ti) (I am slandered) before the king, my lord.
(16-22)--Moreover, when an ant is struck....

EA 252, Reverse: (Photo in Rohl)

(16-22)--Moreover, when an ant is struck, does it not fight back and bite the hand of the man that struck it? How at this time can I show deference and then another city of mine will be seized?
(23-31)--On the other hand, if you also order, "Fall down beneath them so they can strike you," I will d<o> (it). I will guard the men that seized the city (and) my god. They are the despoilers of my father, but I will guard them.-(!) --(complete EA 252, with no lacunae, lines 1-31)

Akkadian text
The Akkadian language text:

English:

(Line 1)--To "King-Lord-mine"
(2)--'speaking'
(3)--'message thus' 1. Labaya, SERVANT-yours
(4)--at feet(s)(pl.) "King-Lord-mine" I bow
(5)--Now, (you) messaged
(6)--to Me: "Guard!
(7)--men who en-sieged (the City)!"
(8)--"How to guard (the) Men, ...
(9)--..in conflict(warfare) en-sieged\ \"sworn" City?"
(10)--"How to swear peace? ..and.. How to swear, "sworn" City?"
(11)--"Commissioner(Man-Great) 'assigned with'-me
(12)--(the) captured, sworn City ! ?"
(13)--And, god(s) 'spoke/heard'
(14)--"(my) parts (are) eaten-mine" \ \ : (–gl–) "I AM SLANDERED"
(15)--before "The King", "Lord-Mine"

Akkadian:

(Line 1)--a-na "LUGAL-EN-ia"
(2)--qí-bil-ma
(3)--um-ma ILa-aB-A-iYa ARAD-ka
(4)--a-na GÌR.MEŠ "LUGAL-be-lí-ia" am-qú-ut
(5)--i-nu-ma šap-ra-ta
(6)--a-na ia-a-ši ú-ṣur-me
(7)--LÚ.MEŠ ša ṣa-ab-tu URU
(8)-- ki-i uṣ-ṣur-ru-na LÚ.MEŠ
(9)--i-na nu-KÚR-te ṣa-ab-te at-me URU
(10)--ki it-mé ša-li-me u ki at-at-me URU
(11)--1. LUGAL.GAL it-ti-ia
(12)--ṣa-ab-ta at-me URU
(13)--ù i-li qa-bi
(14)--qa-ar-ṣí-ia : (–gl–) ši-ir-ti
(15)--i-na pa-ni "1. LUGAL-ma" "be-li-ia"

Cuneiform score, Akkadian, English

Cuneiform score (per CDLI, Chicago Digital Library Initiative), and Akkadian, and English.

Obverse

Paragraph I, (lines 1-4)

1.(P. I of III)-a-na 1=diš ŠÀR bi-lí-ia 
___ana 1=diš ŠÀR bēlu-ia
___To m=male=dišKing Lord-mine
2.qí- -----bil- -----ma( !! )
___qabû — !! 
___speaking — !!
3.um-ma 1=diš La-ab-a-ya ÀRAD-ka
___umma, – 1=diš La-ab-a-ya ÀRAD-ka
___"message thus", – m=male=dišLabaya, servant-yours
4.a-na _GÌRI-MEŠ_-pí (ŠÀR) be-lí-ia am-qú-ut
___ana _GÌRI-MEŠ_-pí (ŠÀR) Bēlu-ia, — maqātu — !
___at (the) feetpl., – (King), Lord-mine, — I bow — !

Paragraph II,  (lines 5-15)

5.(P. II of III)-i-nu-ma šap-ra-ta
___enūma, – šapāru
___Now(at this time), – (you) messaged(wrote):
6.a-na ia-a-ši ú-ṣur-mì
___ana iāši, — Quotenaṣāru — !! —
___to Me, — QuoteEn-Guard — !! —
7. _LÚ-MEŠ_ ša ṣa-ab-tu _IRI_
___ _LÚ-MEŠ_(amēlu)pl. ša ṣabātu _URU_ — ? EndQuote
___(the) menpl. which en-sieged (the) town — ? EndQuote

segue
8.ki-i uṣ-ṣur-ru-na _LÚ-MEŠ_
___Quotekī naṣāru
___ QuoteHow to guard (the) menpl. —,
9.i-na nu-KÚR-ti7 ṣa-ab-ta at-mì _IRI_
___ina nukurtu ṣabātu tamû _URU_ — ?EndQuote
___ in warfare en-sieged (sworn-to) town — ?EndQuote

segue
10.ki it-mi ša-li-mì ù ki it-mì it-ta#-mì
___ Quote-#2kī tamû šalāmu
___ Quote-#2How to swear peace 
10.6--------------ù ki it-mì it-ta#-mì ((IRI))
___-----------------u kī tamû ta#mû (_URU_) — ? 
___-----------------and how "to swear" "sworn-to" (town) — ?
11. 1=(diš)- -----LÚ-GAL- -----it-ti-ia ( !! )
___ ((that))(ša), – 1=(diš)-LÚ-GAL itti--ia – ?
___ ((that)), – (the) m=male=diš-Commissioner (assigned) with-Me – ?
12.ṣa-ab-ta-at-mì _IRI_
___ṣabātu tamû _URU_ — ! ?EndQuote
___(the) captured sworn-to _town_ — ! ?EndQuote-#2

segue
13.Ù i-li qa-bi
___U, – ilu qabû – :
___And, – (the)-god spoke – :
14.qa-ar-ṣí-ia : (–gl–) ši-ir-ti
___Quoteqa-ar-ṣí-ia : (–gl–) ši-ir-ti
___Quote"My parts are eaten"(intestines, insides)-mine : (–gl–) "I am slandered – !"
15.i-na pa-ni-ma be-li-ia
___ina pānu(="face") Bēlu-ia — !EndQuote
___"before", (my)-Lord-mine — !EndQuote

Paragraph III,  (lines 16-31)

16.(P. III)-Ša-ni-tam ki-i na-am-lu
___Šanitam, – kī namlu
___Furthermore, – when ants
17.tu-um-ha-ṣú la-a
___tu-um-ha-ṣú, — lā
___are squeezed, —
17.7--------------la-a
___----------------lā
___----------------(they) do not

Reverse

18.ti-qá-bi-lu ------ ù ta-an-šu-ku
___qabû — !
___(just)(speak) yell — !
18.5-------------ù ta-an-šu-ku
___----------------u našāku — !
___----------------but bite — !
19.qà-ti _LÚ_-lì ša yi-ma-ha-aš-ši
___qātu _LÚ_ ša mahāṣu — !
___(the) HAND, _MAN_, that attacks — !
20.kī a-na-ku i-ša-ha-tu
___Quotekī anāku i-ša-ha-tu
___ QuoteHow (can) I "abide time"
21.ú-ma-an-nu-tú ù
___ú-ma-an-nu-tú —
___day this ("at this time"), —
21.8-------------ù
___----------------u
___----------------and-(with)
22.ṣa-ab-ta-at-mì 2-(diš _IRI_-ia
___ṣabātu–at-mì(tamû) 2-(diš_ _URU_-ia—! ?EndQuote
___seizing (of)–(sworn) 2 cities-mine—! ?EndQuote

segue
23.Ša-ni-tam šum-ma ti-qa-bu
___Šanitam, — šumma qabû
___Furthermore, — when(if) (you) say
24.ap-pu-na-ma
___ap-pu-na-ma (pānu, ?come face)
___Quote"come forward" ((and))
25.nu-pu-ul-mì
___napālu — !
___Demolish — !
26.ṭe-ah-ta-mu ù
___ṭehû u
___approach and
27.ti-ma-ha-ṣú-ka
___mahāṣu, — !
___attack, — !
28.i-pé-<šu>-ú-ṣur-ru-na
29.LÚ-meš ša ṣa-ab-tu4 _IRI_ <ù>
___LÚmeš ṣabātu URU
___(the) menpl. who en-sieged (the) townUnQuote

segue
30.i-li šu-ṣú-mì a-bi-ia
___ilu, — ezēzu abu-ia
___[(the) god(s) ((listened))], — defilers (of) Father-mine
31.ù ú-ṣur-ru : (–gl–) šu-nu
___u, – ezēru : (–gl–) šunu(=them) — !
___and, – I curse them — !

See also
Labaya, of Šakmu (Shechem)
Glossenkeil (Amarna letters)
Amarna letters–phrases and quotations
Cuneiform-bil (in line 2, Obverse)
List of Amarna letters by size
Amarna letter EA 5, EA 9, EA 15, EA 19, EA 26, EA 27, EA 35, EA 38 
EA 153, EA 161, EA 288, EA 364, EA 365, EA 367

Ext links
Line drawing, Obverse & Reverse
EA 252, CDLI (Chicago Digital Library Initiative)
CDLI listing of all EA Amarna letters, 1-382
British Museum site for EA 252, Dimensions, 2.75 in (ht), 2.25 in (width)

References

Moran, William L. The Amarna Letters. Johns Hopkins University Press, 1987, 1992. (softcover)
 Parpola, 1971. The Standard Babylonian Epic of Gilgamesh, Parpola, Simo, Neo-Assyrian Text Corpus Project, c 1997, Tablet I thru Tablet XII, Index of Names, Sign List, and Glossary-(pp. 119–145), 165 pages.
Rohl, 1995. Pharaohs and Kings: A Biblical Quest, Rohl, David M., c 1995, Crown Publishers, Inc., 426 pages. (hardcover)

Amarna letters
Canaan